Venezuela is a federal republic located on the northern coast of South America. Oil was discovered in the early 20th century and, today, Venezuela has the world's largest known oil reserves and has been one of the world's leading exporters of oil. Previously an underdeveloped exporter of agricultural commodities such as coffee and cocoa,  oil quickly came to dominate exports and government revenues. The 1980s oil glut led to an external debt crisis and a long-running economic crisis. Inflation peaked at 100% in 1996. As (by 1998) per capita GDP fell to the same level as 1963, down a third from its 1978 peak. The recovery of oil prices in the early 2000s gave Venezuela oil funds not seen since the 1980s. A destabilized economy led to a crisis in Bolivarian Venezuela, resulting in hyperinflation, an economic depression, shortages of basic goods and drastic increases in poverty, disease, child mortality, malnutrition, and crime.

Notable firms 
This list includes notable companies with primary headquarters located in the country. The industry and sector follow the Industry Classification Benchmark taxonomy. Organizations which have ceased operations are included and noted as defunct.

See also 
 List of Venezuelan television channels
 List of Venezuelan cooperatives

References 

 
Venezuela